Fright may refer to:

 Fright (fear), a state of extreme fear
 Paralysis (sexuality), a state of being paralysed by fear of sexual violence, also known as 'fright' as part of the 'freeze, flight, fight, fright' sequence.
 Fright (comics), a comic book supervillainess
 Fright (film), a 1971 slasher film
 Fright (aka Spell of the Hypnotist) a 1956 horror film dealing with reincarnation